Agostino Gonzaga (died 1557) was a Roman Catholic prelate who served as Archbishop of Reggio Calabria (1537–1557).

Biography
On 11 April 1537, Agostino Gonzaga was appointed during the papacy of Pope Paul III as Archbishop of Reggio Calabria.
He served as Archbishop of Reggio Calabria until his death in 1557.

References

External links and additional sources
 (for Chronology of Bishops) 
 (for Chronology of Bishops) 

16th-century Italian Roman Catholic archbishops
Bishops appointed by Pope Paul III
1557 deaths